John Dent may refer to:

 A number of early settlers and planters related to Charles County, Maryland:
 Captain John Dent (c. 1645–1712), English-born American settler, planter and magistrate, nephew of Thomas Dent Sr.
 General John Dent (1733–1809), politician, magistrate, and general in the Revolutionary War, father of George Dent
 Captain John H. Dent (1782–1823), officer in the United States Navy during the Quasi-War and the First Barbary War, grandson of General John Dent
 John Dent (1751–1811), English founder of Dents leather goods
 John Dent (died 1826) (c. 1760–1826), British Member of Parliament for Lancaster and Poole
 John Dent (merchant) (1821–1892), Hong Kong and Shanghai businessman
 John Dent (Liberal MP) (1826–1894), British Whig/Liberal MP for Knaresborough and Scarborough
 John Dent (biathlete) (born 1938), British Olympic biathlete
 John Charles Dent (1841–1888), Canadian historian
 Johnny Dent (1903–?), English former footballer
 John H. Dent (politician) (1908–1988), Democratic member of the U.S. House of Representatives from Pennsylvania
 John Dent, character in Across the Continent

See also 
 Dent (surname)